Acanthokara is a monospecific genus of ovoviviparous velvet worm, containing the single species Acanthokara kaputensis. This species has 15 pairs of legs in both sexes. The type locality of this species is Mount Kaputar, New South Wales, Australia.

References

Further reading 
 

Onychophorans of Australasia
Onychophoran genera
Monotypic protostome genera
Taxa named by Amanda Reid (malacologist)